Sambas Putra Football Club (simply known as Sambas Putra) is an Indonesian football club based in Sambas Regency, West Kalimantan. They currently compete in the Liga 3 and their homeground is Gabsis Stadium.

References

Football clubs in Indonesia
Football clubs in West Kalimantan
Association football clubs established in 2020
2020 establishments in Indonesia